Tiffany Castle is a landmark home in the historic Pendleton Heights neighborhood in Kansas City, Jackson County, Missouri, United States. It was built in 1909 as the home of Flavel B. Tiffany, who later founded the Tiffany Springs neighborhood of Kansas City. The Tudor architecture castle sits on the bluffs overlooking the East Bottoms and the Missouri River below, and can be seen for miles.

History
Tiffany Castle is named after its builder and first owner, Dr. Flavel B. Tiffany. He was one of the first and most prolific ophthalmologists of Kansas City, living on Millionaire Row on Troost Avenue. He had traveled England and Scotland, and loved the Tudor architecture of castles, so he wanted to build one of his own at 100 Garfield Ave in Kansas City. Its floors and roof are made of reinforced concrete, with walls of solid stone from a quarry at 2nd and Lydia. It sits on the bluffs at the edge of Northeast area of Kansas City, overlooking the East Bottoms and the Missouri River below, and can be seen for miles.

Tiffany's major real estate endeavor was the founding of the town of Tiffany Springs, which he intended to become a major spa resort to rival the successful Excelsior Springs, Missouri. In the late 1880s, he bought 1,100 acres in central Platte County which includes an Artesian aquifer. His plans were not substantially realized, so the city of Kansas City, Missouri eventually annexed most of this land, much of which became the Kansas City International Airport. Tiffany Springs is now a neighborhood of Kansas City.

See also
City workhouse castle, the other castle in Kansas City
List of points of interest in Kansas City, Missouri

References

Buildings and structures in Kansas City, Missouri